Jonathan William Berry, 5th Viscount Camrose is a British hereditary peer and Conservative politician. In a March 2022 by-election, he was elected to replace Lord Rotherwick in the House of Lords following Rotherwick's retirement in February 2022. Camrose made his maiden speech on 27 June 2022.

Parliamentary career

In March 2023, Rishi Sunak appointed Camrose as Parliamentary Under-Secretary of State at the Department for Science, Innovation and Technology. Viscount Camrose became the second hereditary peer to be appointed to a ministerial role by Sunak.

References

External links
Viscount Camrose on the UK Parliament site

1970 births
Living people
Alumni of Durham University
Carnegie Mellon University alumni
Conservative Party (UK) hereditary peers
5
Jonathan
Hereditary peers elected under the House of Lords Act 1999